William Pickering (1894 – 9 November 1917) was a Scottish professional footballer who played in the Football League for Burnley as a centre forward. He also played in the Scottish League for Morton.

Personal life 
In 1915, during the second year of the First World War, Pickering enlisted as a private in the Seaforth Highlanders. Pickering's battalion saw action in the Mesopotamian campaign and he was shot through the head and killed during the Capture of Tikrit on 9 November 1917. He was buried in Baghdad (North Gate) War Cemetery.

Honours 
Burnley
 Lancashire Senior Cup: 1914–15

Career statistics

References

Footballers from Glasgow
Military personnel from Glasgow
Scottish footballers
Association football forwards
Burnley F.C. players
English Football League players
1894 births
1917 deaths
Scottish Football League players
Greenock Morton F.C. players
British Army personnel of World War I
Seaforth Highlanders soldiers
Johnstone F.C. players
Ashfield F.C. players
Burials at Baghdad (North Gate) War Cemetery
British military personnel killed in World War I
Deaths by firearm in Iraq